Eng Abner Nangwale (1932 – January 17, 2013) was a Ugandan politician and member of the Uganda People's Congress. He served as the Minister of Works within the administration of President Milton Obote from 1980 until July 1985. As Minister, Nangwale expanded the government's efforts to provide free, universal education to Ugandan students. Nangwale led the construction of several new Teachers Training Colleges (TTC), now called as Parents Teachers Colleges (PTCs), to train new Ugandan teachers and educators.

Nangwale was born in Bukigai, located in present-day Bududa District, in 1932. He was elected as an MP of the Parliament of Uganda for Manjia County, before his appointment as Minister of Works by President Obote in 1980.

Nangwale died at his home in Bududa, Uganda, on January 17, 2013, at the age of 80.

References

1932 births
2013 deaths
Government ministers of Uganda
Members of the Parliament of Uganda
Uganda People's Congress politicians
People from Bududa District